Mauesia is a genus of longhorn beetles of the subfamily Lamiinae, containing the following species:

 Mauesia acorniculata Julio, 2003
 Mauesia bicornis Julio, 2003
 Mauesia cornuta Lane, 1956
 Mauesia panamensis Moyses & Galileo, 2009
 Mauesia simplicis Moyses & Galileo, 2009
 Mauesia submetallica Martins & Galileo, 2010

References

Mauesiini